John Croydon (3 November 1907 – February 1994) was a British film producer and production manager.

He was employed at Ealing Studios for a number of years during the Michael Balcon era. He then moved to Highbury Studios in the late 1940s to head up production of second features for the Rank Organisation, and later turned to independent production once Highbury had been closed.

Selected filmography
 Champagne Charlie (1944)
 Dead of Night (1945)
 Nicholas Nickleby (1947)
 Colonel Bogey (1948)
 Love in Waiting (1948)
 A Piece of Cake (1948)
 Penny and the Pownall Case (1948)
 To the Public Danger (1948)
 Badger's Green (1949)
 Stop Press Girl (1949)
 White Corridors (1951)
 One Wild Oat (1951)
 Operation Malaya (1953)
 Delavine Affair (1954)
 Tarzan and the Lost Safari (1957)
 The Haunted Strangler (1958)
 Corridors of Blood (1958)
 First Man into Space (1959)
 A High Wind in Jamaica (1965)
 The Projected Man (1966)

References

Bibliography
 Chibnall, Steve & McFarlane, Brian. The British 'B' Film. Palgrave MacMillan, 2009.

External links

1907 births
1994 deaths
Film producers from London